Squirrelfish may refer to:

 Squirrelfish or Holocentridae, a family of ray-finned fish
 SquirrelFish, a JavaScript engine being developed by the Webkit project
 Squirrel fish, a dish in Chinese cuisine